The 2022 Nobel Peace Prize was awarded jointly to one individual and two organisations which advocate human rights and civil liberty. The recipients were the Belarusian activist Ales Bialiatski (born 1962), the Russian human rights organisation Memorial (founded in 1989) and the Ukrainian human rights organisation Center for Civil Liberties (founded in 2007). The citation given by the Norwegian Nobel Committee were the following:

Reactions
In Ukraine the joint awarding to organisations from Ukraine, Russia and Belarus was criticised by journalists for allegedly upholding the Russian nationalist stereotype of the "three brotherly people." The choice of the committee to award the prize while Russia and Ukraine were at war (with Belarus giving logistical support to the Russian army) was also criticised. According to the Center for Civil Liberties (in a press conference on 8 October 2022) "In no way should this award sound like an old narrative about fraternal nations" but "this story is about resistance to common evil." At the time of the press conference neither Ukrainian President Volodymyr Zelenskyy nor any other (Ukrainian) government official had congratulated the Center for Civil Liberties on winning the Nobel Prize.

Candidates
Prior to his 2022 Ales Bialiatski's Nobel Peace Prize, he was nominated five times unsuccessfully. According to the Nobel Committee, there were 343 candidates for the 2022 Nobel Peace Prize, out of which 251 are individuals and 92 are organisations, becoming the second highest number recorded in history.

Prize committee
The members of the Norwegian Nobel Committee that are responsible for selecting the laureate in accordance with the will of Alfred Nobel are the same as last year:
 Berit Reiss-Andersen (chair, born 1954), advocate (barrister) and former President of the Norwegian Bar Association, former state secretary for the Minister of Justice and the Police (representing the Labour Party). Member of the Norwegian Nobel Committee since 2012, reappointed for the period 2018–2023.
 Asle Toje (vice chair, born 1974), foreign policy scholar. Appointed for the period 2018–2023.
 Anne Enger (born 1949), former Leader of the Centre Party and Minister of Culture. Member since 2018, reappointed for the period 2021–2026.
 Kristin Clemet (born 1957), former Minister of Government Administration and Labour and Minister of Education and Research. Appointed for the period 2021–2026.
 Jørgen Watne Frydnes (born 1984), former board member of Médecins Sans Frontières Norway, board member of the Norwegian Helsinki Committee. Appointed for the period 2021–2026.

References 

2022
Nobel Peace Prize
Memorial (society)